This was the Krankies fourth solo attempt at a children's  television show since Crackerjack!, this time on ITV.

References 

1989 British television series debuts
1992 British television series endings
1980s British children's television series
1990s British children's television series
Television shows produced by Border Television
Television series by ITV Studios
ITV children's television shows
English-language television shows